Rashidiya School, or Al-Rashidiya Secondary School for Boys, is a public school located in East Jerusalem next to Herod's Gate (Bab as-Sahira). Rashidiya served as the main learning establishment for the residents of East Jerusalem since the late Ottoman era. Today, Rashidiya has approximately 400 students and a staff of 25. The school consists of 3 main buildings which include 20 classrooms, a library, a laboratory and a soccer field.

Notable principals
Muhammad Qaimari, (1956?-1967)
Rateb al-Rabi, (1967-1986?)

Notable teachers
Mohammad Amin al-Husayni (c. 1897–1974), Grand Mufti of Jerusalem; in 1920
Jabra Ibrahim Jabra (1919–1994), author, poet, artist and intellectual

Notable alumni
Jabra Ibrahim Jabra
Aziz Abu Sarah
Mahdi Abdul Hadi
Omar Aggad

Schools in Jerusalem